Paweł Paczkowski (born 14 June 1993) is a Polish handball player who plays for Industria Kielce.

He participated at the 2017 World Men's Handball Championship.

References

1993 births
Living people
People from Świecie
Polish male handball players
Vive Kielce players
Veszprém KC players
HC Motor Zaporizhia players
Expatriate handball players
Polish expatriates in France
Sportspeople from Kuyavian-Pomeranian Voivodeship